Acoustic:Latte is the acoustic compilation album of the Japanese pop rock group Every Little Thing, released on February 16, 2005.

Track listing

Notes
 Additional arrangement by Shinji Tanahashi.

Charts

External links
 Acoustic : Latte information at Avex Network.
 Acoustic : Latte information at Oricon.

2005 albums
Every Little Thing (band) albums